The 2002 W-League Season was the league's 8th.

Teams 
 Albuquerque Crush
 Arizona Heatwave
 Asheville Splash
 Boston Renegades
 Charlotte Lady Eagles
 Chicago Red Eleven
 Cincinnati Ladyhawks
 Jacksonville Jade
 Kansas City Mystics
 Kentucky Fillies
 Long Island Rough Riders
 Maryland Pride
 Memphis Mercury
 Mile High Edge
 New Hampshire Lady Phantoms
 New Jersey Lady Stallions
 New Jersey Wildcats
 New York Magic
 Northern Kentucky TC Stars
 Northern Virginia Majestics
 Oklahoma Outrage
 Ottawa Fury Women
 Piedmont Spark
 Rhode Island Lady Stingrays
 Rochester Ravens
 Seattle Sounders Women
 South Jersey Banshees
 Tampa Bay Xtreme
 Toronto Inferno
 Virginia Beach Piranhas

Championship 
 Boston Renegades 3-0 Charlotte Lady Eagles

See also 
 2002 PDL Season

References 

USL W-League (1995–2015) seasons
2002 in American soccer leagues
2002 in American women's soccer
2002 in Canadian women's soccer